Mentiroso may refer to:
 Mentiroso (Enrique Iglesias song), 2002
 Mentiroso (Kenia Os song), 2019

See also
 Mentiroso Lake, a lake in the Pando Department, Bolivia